¿Quién es la máscara? is a Mexican reality singing competition television series based on the South Korean television program King of Mask Singer. The show involves a group of celebrities that hide behind a character and, week after week, panelists will try to discover who is behind the mask. The show is currently hosted by Adrián Uribe.

Series overview

Episodes

Season 1 (2019)

Season 2 (2020)

Season 3 (2021)

Season 4 (2022)

Viewership and ratings

Notes

References

External links 
 

Quién es la máscara
Episodes